The Snake River is a  tributary of the Niobrara River.  Entirely located within the Sandhills of north-central Nebraska, the Snake River rises near the eastern edge of Sheridan County.  It flows eastward into Cherry County and passes along the southern edge of Samuel R. McKelvie National Forest.  On the southeast edge of the national forest, the river is dammed to form Merritt Reservoir.  At this point, the river makes a sharp turn to the north. 

Snake River Falls is immediately to the north of Merritt Reservoir; it is the largest waterfall, as measured by volume, in the state. (Nebraska's highest waterfall is Smith Falls.)

See also

List of Nebraska rivers

References

External links

Snake River Falls

Rivers of Nebraska
Rivers of Cherry County, Nebraska
Rivers of Sheridan County, Nebraska